Perrine Clauzel (born 5 April 1994) is a French cross-country and cyclo-cross cyclist. She placed 23rd in the women's cross-country race at the 2016 Summer Olympics.

References

1994 births
Living people
French female cyclists
Olympic cyclists of France
Cyclists at the 2016 Summer Olympics
Cyclists at the 2015 European Games
European Games competitors for France
Cyclo-cross cyclists
Sportspeople from Colmar
Cyclists from Grand Est